Tian (also Romanized as Ţīān) is a village in Keshvar Rural District, Papi District, Khorramabad County, Lorestan Province, Iran. As of the 2006 census, its population was 27 with there being 5 families.

References 

Towns and villages in Khorramabad County